Gabrielle Glaister is an English actress, best known for her role as Patricia Farnham in British soap opera Brookside and Trish Wallace in Family Affairs. She is notable also for her portrayal of Bob/Kate/Bobbie Parkhurst in several episodes of “Blackadder”.

Education
Glaister attended Chichester College where she studied English and Drama, then trained at the National Youth Theatre, before appearing on Broadway.

Career
Glaister appeared in the title role in a stage production of Oliver Twist, alongside Ben Elton as the Artful Dodger. In 1983, she returned to the stage in Denise Deegan's comedy play Daisy Pulls It Off, based on Winifred Norling's 1939 novel The Testing of Tansy.

Glaister's first television roles were in 1983 in Jury and Jane Eyre. Her first notable television roles were three appearances as "Bob" in the 1980s Blackadder series and the part of Patricia Farnham, the long-suffering partner of Max Farnham (Steven Pinder), in Brookside from 1990 until 1997.

Glaister returned to soap acting in 2000 when she appeared in Coronation Street as Debs Brownlow, the sister of Natalie Horrocks, played by Denise Welch. Her next soap role was in Channel 5 soap Family Affairs from September 2004 playing Trish Wallace until September 2005. In 2019, Glaister took the role of Hilary Benshaw in Emmerdale, playing rival to Nicola King as they both vied to be elected as a local councillor.

Filmography

Television
 Jane Eyre (1983)
 Blackadder II (1986) "Bells"
 All at No 20 (1986)
 Grange Hill (1988)
 Blackadder Goes Forth (1989) "Major Star", "Private Plane"
 Brookside as Patricia Farnham (1990 to 1995)
 Coronation Street as Debs Brownlow (2000)
 Family Affairs (2004 to 2005)
 Law & Order: UK (2009) "Honour Bound"
 New Tricks (2012) "Part of a Whole"
 The Dumping Ground (2014) "Face the Music"
 Upstart Crow (2016) "The Quality of Mercy", reprising the role of Bob from Blackadder II.
 Sherlock (2017) "The Six Thatchers"
 Unforgotten (2018)
 Emmerdale as Hilary Benshaw (2019)
 Dark Money as Cordelia (2019)
 Doctors as Martha Taile (2020)
Coronation Street (2022)

Film
 Buddy's Song (1990)
 The Heart Surgeon (1997)

Theatre
Rent

References

External links
 
 Joining Coronation Street in 2000

1960 births
Living people
English television actresses
English soap opera actresses
English film actresses
English stage actresses
People from Moreton-in-Marsh
People from Godalming
People educated at Godalming Grammar School
National Youth Theatre members